Guy Bono (born 30 April 1953 in Béja, Béja Governorate, Tunisia) is a French politician and Member of the European Parliament for the south-east of France. He is a member of the Socialist Party, which is part of the Party of European Socialists, and sits on the European Parliament's Committee on Culture and Education.

He is a substitute for the Committee on Transport and Tourism, a member of the delegation to the EU–Mexico Joint Parliamentary Committee, and a substitute for the delegation for relations with the countries of Central America.

Career 
 Diploma in chemistry, National Centre for Industrial Arts and Crafts (CNAM)
 Director of cultural affairs, Department of Bouches-du-Rhône (1983-1992)
 Director of cultural affairs for the Fos-Istres-Miramas new urban area grouping (1992-1998)
 Local authority manager
 Member of the Socialist Party national council
 Member of the Socialist Party's national bureau
 Member of the Socialist Party's national secretariat
 Vice-Chairman of the Provence-Alpes-Côte d'Azur Regional Council

External links 
  (in French)
 European Parliament biography
 Member of Parliament Profile

1953 births
Living people
MEPs for South-East France 2004–2009
Socialist Party (France) MEPs
People from Béja